Ricochet is an action-adventure game, originally written for the BBC Micro and Acorn Electron home computers, published by Superior Software in 1989. It was written by Neil Davidson and David Williams, with some graphics work and level design by Nik Weston and Guy Burt. 

The object of the game is to retrieve five hourglasses from diverse scenarios to restore the flow of time. It features elements of both platform and puzzle games. The puzzles are mostly logical (keys unlock doors, gold placates a burglar), though there are exceptions.

While the game shares many elements made popular in earlier Superior arcade adventures such as Citadel, it has a unique feel due to the movement of the main character. The player controls a creature named "SPRAT" (Small Partially Robotic Alien Time-traveller), depicted as a red sphere wearing sunglasses. SPRAT moves by rolling but can only do so along level ground or down slopes. There are ladders to climb but many platforms require a special movement to be reached. By holding 'down' (SPRAT squashes himself) to build up potential energy, then releasing, SPRAT can bounce at either a 45 or 90 degree angle.

Legacy
Ricochet is one of a range of 1980s Superior games that was re-released for Microsoft Windows by Superior Interactive, with new graphics and added levels.

External links
Superior Software

1989 video games
BBC Micro and Acorn Electron games
Superior Software games
Video games developed in the United Kingdom
Video games scored by Rob Hubbard
Windows games
Single-player video games